The 2017–18 season was Bristol City's 120th season as a professional football club and their third consecutive season back in the Championship. Along with competing in the Championship, the club also participated in the FA Cup and EFL Cup, reaching the semi-finals of the latter competition. The season covered the period from 1 July 2017 to 30 June 2018.

Month by month review

June
On 27 June, Bristol City agreed to sign right-back Eros Pisano on a two-year deal, with it being officially confirmed on 1 July when his contract with Hellas Verona expired. On 28 June, City broke their transfer record to sign striker Famara Diédhiou from Angers for a £5.3 million transfer fee.

July
On 7 July, Aaron Wilbraham signed a one-year contract with the club. On 13 July, attacking midfielder Lee Tomlin transferred to Cardiff City for an undisclosed fee. On 28 July, defender Nathan Baker, having previously spent the 2015–16 season on loan from Aston Villa, signed for City on a four-year deal for an undisclosed fee.

December 
After beating three other Premier League sides, Bristol City were drawn against holders Manchester United in the quarter-finals of the EFL Cup. The game was played at Ashton Gate on 20 December and marked the first time City and United had met competitively since 1980, when City were last in the top flight. City took the lead through a thunderous Joe Bryan strike just after the second half began. Zlatan Ibrahimović equalised only seven minutes later. City sealed a dramatic and famous win as Korey Smith beat goalkeeper Sergio Romero with a 93rd-minute strike to make it 2–1 to the Robins. At the final whistle, fans invaded the pitch and lifted City players onto their shoulders.

After the match, City manager Lee Johnson said the result was "a historic occasion" and Smith's winner would "live in the memory for many generations". In defeating United, Bristol City became only the second side from a lower division to eliminate four top-flight teams in one League Cup campaign, after Sheffield Wednesday in 1990-91. City were drawn against United's city rivals Manchester City in the semi-finals of the competition, with the first leg at the Etihad Stadium.

On 26 December, Bristol City finished the day second in the Championship table as they defeated Reading 2–0 at home. Jamie Paterson scored the first, before Lloyd Kelly's first goal for City in stoppage time sealed the win. On 28 December, Bristol City lost at home to Wolverhampton Wanderers.

January 
On 9 January, Bristol City travelled to the Premier League leaders to take on Manchester City in the semi-final first leg of the EFL Cup. The 7,680 Bristol City fans who arrived set a record for the most away fans in the Etihad Stadium's history. Manchester City were overwhelming favourites, unbeaten in the Premier League and having won 20 of their 22 matches so far. Bristol City played well and took a shock lead after Bobby Reid won and scored a penalty just before half-time. Kevin De Bruyne scored ten minutes into the second half and Bristol City looked to have secured a memorable draw before substitute Sergio Agüero scored with a 92nd-minute header to seal a 2–1 win.

The return leg was another entertaining affair at a sold out and noisy Ashton Gate, although Manchester City were comfortable for the most part. Leroy Sané scored just before half-time and Agüero scored just after to give Manchester City a 4–1 aggregate lead. Marlon Pack reduced the deficit before Aden Flint scored in injury time to give Bristol City hope. De Bruyne scored shortly after to kill the game, make it 3–2 on the night and 5–3 on aggregate.

After the game, Lee Johnson said Bristol City were a "Premier League club in training." Manchester City manager Pep Guardiola praised Bristol City and Lee Johnson after the two-legged affair: "It was a nice game, beautiful game, and all my credit to Bristol City. Big congratulations. He [Johnson] came here to try to play. They arrived, they created chances".

April 
After a goalless draw against Nottingham Forest, Bristol City could no longer mathematically reach the playoffs, ending their chances of promotion.

A 3–2 home loss to fellow mid-table side Sheffield United on the last day of the season saw City eventually finish 11th. While this was disappointing after being 2nd on Boxing Day, this was the club's highest finish for eight years since 2009-10, when Lee Johnson was playing for the club and his father, Gary Johnson, was manager.

Transfers

In

Out

Loan in

Loan out

Pre-season

Friendlies

Competitions

Championship

League table

FA Cup

EFL Cup

Squad statistics
Source:

Numbers in parentheses denote appearances as substitute.
Players with squad numbers struck through and marked  left the club during the playing season.
Players with names in italics and marked * were on loan from another club for the whole of their season with Bristol City.
Players listed with no appearances have been in the matchday squad but only as unused substitutes.
Key to positions: GK – Goalkeeper; DF – Defender; MF – Midfielder; FW – Forward

References

Bristol City
Bristol City F.C. seasons